Pedro López was a Spanish painter. He was a pupil of El Greco. He painted, among many others, the Adoration of the Kings in the convent of the Trinitarians at Toledo; it bears his name, and the date 1608.

References

17th-century Spanish painters
Spanish male painters
Spanish Renaissance painters
Year of death unknown
Year of birth unknown